Katharine Fraser, Mistress of Saltoun, DL (born 11 October 1957) is the daughter of Captain Alexander Ramsay of Mar and Flora Fraser, 21st Lady Saltoun.

Biography
She was born Katharine Ingrid Mary Isabel Ramsay in Fraserburgh, Scotland. Her mother, Lady Saltoun, is the suo jure Lady Saltoun and the Chief of the name and arms of Fraser. Her father was the great-grandson of Queen Victoria.

As the eldest daughter without any brothers, Fraser is the heir presumptive to the chiefship and the lordship held by her mother. Since one cannot become the chief of a clan without taking the clan's surname, Lord Lyon King of Arms recognized her use of the surname Fraser in 1973.

On 20 April 2005, Fraser was appointed a deputy lieutenant of Aberdeenshire.

Fraser is a second cousin of the Swedish king King Carl XVI Gustaf of Sweden, Queen Margrethe II of Denmark, and Queen Anne-Marie of Greece.

Marriage and children
In February, 1980, the engagement between Fraser and Captain Mark Malise Nicolson (b. 29 September 1954) was announced. Fraser and Captain Nicolson married on 3 May 1980. They have three children.

References

1957 births
Katharine
Living people
Deputy Lieutenants of Aberdeenshire
Daughters of barons